Ajibade is a common Nigerian given name of Yoruba origin.

Notable people with the name include:

As a surname

 Kunle Ajibade (born 1958), Nigerian writer, author and journalist
 Yemi Ajibade (1929–2013), Nigerian playwright
 Gbenro Ajibade, Nigerian actor
 Tosin Ajibade (born 1987), Nigerian blogger
 Oluwatosin Oluwole Ajibade (born 1991), Nigerian singer

As a given name

 Ajibade Babalade (1972–2020), Nigerian footballer
 Ajibade Gbadegesin Ogunoye III (born 1966), Nigerian monarch
 Ajibade Omolade (born 1984),  Nigerian footballer
 Sunday Ajibade Adenihun, Nigerian governor

References 

Yoruba given names
Yoruba-language surnames